The Global Health Security Initiative (GHSI) is an informal international partnership among countries in order to exchange information and coordinate practices for confronting new threats and risks to global health. It was formed to respond to threats of biological, chemical, or radio-nuclear terrorism (CBRN), with pandemic influenza added to the scope a year later.

History
The idea on which the Global Health Security Initiative is based was suggested by then US Secretary of Health and Human Services, Tommy Thompson, after the World Trade Center attacks on 9 September 2001. He proposed that countries fighting bioterrorism should collaborate, share information and coordinate their efforts in order to best protect global health.

GHSI was launched in November 2001 by Canada (who hosted the first meeting in Ottawa), the European Commission, France, Germany, Italy, Japan, Mexico, the United Kingdom and the United States. The World Health Organization (WHO) would act as observer to the GHSI. The ministers agreed on eight areas in which the partnership could collaborate in order to "strengthen public health preparedness and response to the threat of international biological, chemical and radio-nuclear terrorism".

In December 2002 at a meeting in Mexico City, the Ministers broadened the scope of the mandate to include the public health threat posed by pandemic influenza.

Aims and scope
GHSI states that its mandate is "to undertake concerted global action to strengthen public health preparedness and response to chemical, biological, radiological, and nuclear (CBRN) threats, as well as pandemic influenza", which include intentional, accidental and naturally occurring events.

Organization
The Global Health Security Action Group (GHSAG) is made up of senior officials from each member country. The GHSI Secretariat organises, manages and administers meetings and committees and sets priorities.

Various technical/scientific working groups  focus on specific areas of knowledge. Current working groups include:
 Chemical Events Working Group: focuses on the risk prioritization of chemicals, the identification of research needs and best practices in the area of medical countermeasures, as well as other cross-hazard projects such as early alerting and reporting.
 Biological Working Group: focuses on addressing existing gaps and research and development needs required for GHSI member countries to prepare for and respond to biological threats, excluding pandemic influenza and other respiratory viruses of pandemic potential.
 Laboratory Network: focuses on promoting quality assurance in diagnostics, flexibility and adaptability of techniques and technologies and addressing issues regarding transport of specimens.
 Radio-Nuclear Threats Working Group: focuses on collaboration with other radiation protection and nuclear safety authorities on emergency preparedness, undertakes projects in areas such as countermeasures and laboratory aping, and serves as an informal communication network during emergencies.
 Pandemic Influenza Working Group: focuses on sharing and comparing respective national approaches to pandemic preparedness, including vaccine and anti-viral stockpiling and use, surveillance and epidemiology, diagnostics, and public health measures.

See also
 Biosecurity
 Bioterrorism
 CBRN defense
 Centers for Disease Control and Prevention (United States)
 Council of Europe Convention on the Prevention of Terrorism
 Emergent virus
 European Centre for Disease Prevention and Control (EU)
 Health Threat Unit (EU)
 Pandemic

References

Sources

External links
 Working Together to Counter Global Health Threats  Event featuring Michael Leavitt, Secretary of the U.S. Department of Health and Human Services, at the Woodrow Wilson Center in October 2007.

Public health organizations
Nuclear warfare
Biological warfare
Chemical warfare
International medical and health organizations
International organizations based in Canada
Radiation protection organizations